"Panic" is the debut single from Sublime with Rome's debut studio album, Yours Truly. It was first premiered by the Los Angeles radio station KROQ on May 6, 2011.

Charts

Weekly charts

Year-end charts

References

Sublime with Rome songs
2011 songs
2011 debut singles
Fueled by Ramen singles